This is a listing of the horses that finished in either first, second, or third place and the number of starters in the Dancing Count Stakes, an American stakes race for three-year-olds at six furlongs on dirt held at Laurel Park Racecourse in Baltimore, Maryland.  (List 1985–present)

* On January 30, 2010, Racing Secretary Georganne Hale reported that the entire Saturday card at Laurel Park would be canceled due to 6.5" of snow and ice. Later that afternoon she reported that the running of the Dancing Count Stakes had been cancelled for this year and would not be carded anytime in 2010.

References

External links
 Laurel Park website

Lists of horse racing results
Laurel Park Racecourse